Gayla Joy Hendren McKenzie is a lawyer and state legislator in Arkansas, serving in the Arkansas House of Representatives. In 2021, she began her second term. She represents District 92 which includes portions of Benton County, Arkansas. She lives in Gravette and is married with two children. Kim Hendren is her father, and fellow legislator Jim Hendren is her brother. Her sister, Hope Hendren Duke, is running for their brother's seat in the State House. She established and ran a radio station for more than two decades and later owned a stone business. The radio station is KBVA.

References

Year of birth missing (living people)
Living people
Arkansas lawyers
Republican Party Arkansas state senators
Hutchinson family
Republican Party members of the Arkansas House of Representatives